Thulani Shabalala (born 1968) is a member of Ladysmith Black Mambazo, a South African choral group founded in 1960 by his father Joseph.

Thulani was born in Ladysmith (eMnambithi district) to Joseph and his wife Nellie. In 1976, Joseph brought together his six sons to form Mshengu White Mambazo, Ladysmith's 'junior choir', in which Thulani sung as one of the bass voices.

After the murder of his uncle Headman Shabalala in December 1991 and the retirement of several other members  Geophrey Mdletshe and Ben Shabalala), Joseph later recruited Thulani and his brothers Sibongiseni, Thamsanqa and Msizi. Thulani has been a part of the line-up since 1993 and is one of four basses (the others being Russel Mthembu, Abednego Mazibuko and Sibongiseni Shabalala).

Thulani is also a member of the group Izimpande, formed in 2002 with ten native South Africans who were raised on the music and native dance of South Africa.  To date, they have released two albums, Asibuye Emasisweni (Back to my Roots) and Unity is Power.  Although Thulani is now making his name known in South Africa, he also continues to be a part of Black Mambazo.

References

Ladysmith Black Mambazo members
20th-century South African male singers
1968 births
Living people
21st-century South African male singers